Munster is a commune in the Haut-Rhin department in Grand Est in north-eastern France.

It is located in the valley of the river Fecht, in the Vosges mountains about 15 kilometres west of Colmar on the D417 road to the Col de la Schlucht and Épinal.

The town's inhabitants are known in French as munstériens.

The site of a 7th-century abbey or monastery, which gave the place its name, it is famous for its cheese (the Munster cheese).

In the nearby village of Gunsbach, Albert Schweitzer grew up in the late 19th century, when the region was known as Elsaß-Lothringen (Alsace-Lorraine) and was part of the German Empire from 1871 to 1918. The village is home to the international Albert Schweitzer association AISL (Association Internationale Schweitzer Lambaréné).
 Dom George Franck (c.1690 – 1760) organist and composer was born in Munster.

See also
 Communes of the Haut-Rhin département
 Munster cheese

References

External links

 Tourism office website
 
 Flickr Munster

Communes of Haut-Rhin
Free imperial cities
Décapole
Haut-Rhin communes articles needing translation from French Wikipedia